I'm a Celebrity... Get Me Out of Here! returned to ITV1 for an eighth series from 16 November to 5 December 2008. Ant & Dec returned to present the main show on ITV, whilst Matt Willis, Emma Willis and Mark Durden-Smith returned to host spin-off show I'm a Celebrity...Get Me Out of Here! NOW! on ITV2. It was the first series to use a redesigned logo, which imitates the Hollywood Sign. The winner of this series was Joe Swash.

Contestants
The show began with 10 celebrity contestants. On 19 November, they were joined by two new contestants – David Van Day and Timmy Mallett – who were 'kidnapped' on their way into camp, making a total of 12 contestants.

Results and elimination

The Camps
For the first four days of the show, the group of celebrities were split between two camps: "Home", and "Away". The celebrities in each group were:
 Home Camp: Brian, Dani, George, Joe, Martina
 Away Camp: Carly, Esther, Nicola, Robert, Simon

Which group lived in which camp was decided by the first Bushtucker Trial. As Joe won, his group moved in to Home Camp, whilst Simon's group moved into Away Camp. The two camps competed in Bushtucker Trials, with the winning camp receiving better food.

Home was the better of the two camps, featuring a London Bus for the celebrities to sleep in. Contestants in Home camp received British food if they won head-to-head Bushtucker Trials.  Meanwhile, the celebrities in Away Camp were forced to sleep on the jungle floor, and received Australian food if they won trials.  There was also a jail in away camp for 'naughty' celebs.

On 18 November 2008, the two camps merged. The celebrities in the Away Camp moved into the Home Camp. The merger was due to take place on the morning of 19 November 2008, however it was brought forward after a storm left the Away Camp flooded.

Bushtucker Trials
The contestants take part in daily trials to earn food.

 The public voted for who they wanted to face the trial
 The contestants decided who did which trial
 The trial was compulsory and neither the public or celebrities decided who took part

Notes
 Owing to Joe's win, his Team went to the best camp (Home Camp) as the prize 
 It was a live trial for the first time this series. Also for the first time the other celebrities got to watch 
 Esther was ruled out of this trial due to medical reasons 
 Simon was ruled out due to an injury to his back received in the Bush Battle, Hog Roast
 The two bottom place celebrities in the vote-off went head-to-head in the trial. The loser would go home and the winner would return to camp and be immune from the next vote-off

Star count

Bush Battles 
Just like Series 7, some celebrities will be granted immunity from the first vote-off. The five winners of this prize will be decided by five 'bush battles' (one winner in each.) Each of the 12 celebrities will compete in one of four battles, each containing three campmates. The winners will automatically gain immunity while the second-placed contestants will compete for a final place in the fifth and final bout. In the end, there were six winners due to a problem in the second battle.
This feature replaced the 'Celebrity Chests' for five episodes.

 Simon injured himself during the Hog Roast Bush Battle. Because of this, the battle was forced to end early, and both Carly and Simon won immunity.

Ratings 
All ratings are taken from the UK Programme Ratings website, BARB.

 Series Average: 8.77 million

References

External links 
 
 
 Official Ant & Dec Website

2008 British television seasons
08